The 1901 Italian Football Championship season was won by Milan.

Qualifications
Played on April 14

|}

Semifinal
Played in Turin on April 28

|}

Final
Played in Genoa on May 5

|}

References and sources
Almanacco Illustrato del Calcio - La Storia 1898-2004, Panini Edizioni, Modena, September 2005

1901
1900–01 in European association football leagues
1900–01 in Italian football